Sanka  is a village in the administrative district of Gmina Krzeszowice, within Kraków County, Lesser Poland Voivodeship, in southern Poland.

The village has a population of 1,116. *Religions: Roman Catholicism (The Church), Jehovah's Witnesses.
Buildings: a Church, a Scholl

References

Sanka